Master Sergeant Donald Walter Duncan (March 18, 1930 – March 25, 2009) was a U.S. Army Special Forces soldier who served during the Vietnam War, helping to establish the guerrilla infiltration force Project DELTA there. Following his return to the United States, Duncan became one of the earliest military opponents of the war and one of the antiwar movement leading public figures. Duncan is best remembered as the cover image on the February 1966 issue of Ramparts where he announced "I quit", as well as for his testimony to the 1967 Russell Tribunal detailing American war crimes in Vietnam.

Biography

Early years
Donald Walter Duncan was born to Walter Cameron Duncan and Norma Duncan (née Brooker) in Toronto on March 18, 1930, but was a US citizen.
Duncan's father died when he was young, and his mother married Henry de Czanyi von Gerber, a naturalized American, cellist and orchestra conductor. Through the marriage Duncan gained a stepsister, Frances (later known as actress Mitzi Gaynor).

Military career
Duncan was drafted into the U.S. Army and first served as a non-commissioned officer in Germany in the field of operations and intelligence. Duncan married Apollonia Röesch in West Germany 1955, after a previous marriage ended in divorce. They had two daughters and later divorced; The New York Times reported that Duncan married additional times, but their identities and whether he had more children is not known.

Duncan transferred to U.S. Army Special Forces (the "Green Berets") in the first part of 1961, where he continued to work in the field of operations and intelligence. During this interval Duncan received additional training in communications, weapons, and demolitions. Duncan served as an instructor at the United States Army Special Warfare School at Fort Bragg, North Carolina for a year and a half, teaching courses to Special Forces members on intelligence tactics and interrogation methods.

Duncan was deployed in Vietnam in March 1964, serving in a variety of capacities with the 5th Special Forces Group and Project DELTA, which he helped to organize. In addition to briefing and debriefing incoming and outgoing soldiers in the theater, Duncan directly participated in 8-member intelligence and "hunter-killer" teams.

As a result of his combat activity, Duncan was a recipient of two awards of the Bronze Star, the Air Medal, and the Vietnamese Cross of Gallantry with Silver Star. He was additionally recommended for the Silver Star and the Legion of Merit as well as a field promotion to captain, all of which he refused over time.

Duncan was also tapped to help write the official history of U.S. Special Forces in Vietnam, spending the last 6 or 8 weeks of his tour engaged in this task. He later recalled, "I had to pore over MACV (Military Assistance Command, Vietnam) intelligence reports almost daily.... I was absolutely astounded. It was bullshit. Pure fabrication. Routine fabrication.... From that day I grabbed and analyzed every report I could get my hands on having anything to do with intelligence and policy. It was obvious we had no policy and intelligence was whatever MACV said it was." He continued, "Instead of cleaning up corruption in the country, we became the biggest contributors to it. We supported the worst elements in the country. We had nothing to win. The whole thing was a lie."

Disillusioned with the military situation of the war, Duncan declined the offer of promotion and ended his military career, returning to America.

Journalistic career

Back home in the United States, Duncan moved to Berkeley, California with his wife. There he became active in the anti-war movement and became a writer for Ramparts magazine, one of the leading publications of the New Left in America.

In the February 1966 issue of Ramparts, Duncan published a fierce critique of American participation in the war, entitled "The Whole Thing was a Lie!" The magazine cover famously showed Duncan in his full Master Sergeant uniform announcing "I quit". The article explained his opposition to the war by providing details on the American connection to the corrupt government of South Vietnam as well as atrocities in the American conduct of the war effort, including training in the use of torture in interrogations and the use of Vietnamese proxies for the summary execution of prisoners.

In 1967 Random House published a book written by Duncan entitled The New Legions which was sharply critical of the American military campaign in Vietnam.

Duncan also presented testimony on American war crimes in Vietnam to the Russell Tribunal in Roskilde, Denmark in November 1967, where he was one of the first three former American soldiers to testify. There he detailed a de facto class in torture techniques conducted for members of the Special Forces entitled "Counter-Measures to Hostile Interrogation."

In 1971 Duncan delivered the closing statement to the Winter Soldier Investigation conducted by Vietnam Veterans Against the War.

Later life, death, and aftermath

Duncan settled in Indiana around 1980 and in 1990 founded a nonprofit group that provided services for the poor. He died at a nursing home in Madison, Indiana on March 25, 2009, aged 79. The only known mention of his death from the time is an obituary in The Madison Courier, though it did not mention his military career or his activism. His death was not further reported, and connected with his work in opposition to the war, until 2016, when The New York Times published an obituary. Editor William McDonald later wrote that the death became known to the newspaper during research on what was planned to be Duncan's advance obituary, written by Robert D. McFadden. Regarding the decision to complete and publish the article seven years after the subject's death, McDonald said:

Works
 The New Legions. New York: Random House, 1967.
  Originally published in Ramparts, February 1966. Vietnam Full Disclosure

Further reading
 John Duffett (ed.), Against the Crime of Silence: Proceedings of the Russell International War Crimes Tribunal. New York: O'Hare Books, 1968.
 Angus MacKenzie, Secrets: The CIA's War at Home. Berkeley, CA: University of California Press, 1999.
 Gerald Nicosia, Home to War: A History of Vietnam Veterans' Movement. New York: Crown Publishers, 2001.

See also
 A Matter of Conscience
 Concerned Officers Movement
 Court-martial of Howard Levy
 FTA Show - 1971 anti-Vietnam War road show for GIs
 F.T.A. - documentary film about the FTA Show
 Fort Hood Three
 GI's Against Fascism
 GI Coffeehouses
 GI Underground Press
 Movement for a Democratic Military
 Opposition to United States involvement in the Vietnam War
 Presidio mutiny
 Sir! No Sir!, a documentary about the anti-war movement within the ranks of the United States Armed Forces
 Stop Our Ship (SOS) anti-Vietnam War movement in and around the U.S. Navy
 Vietnam Veterans Against the War
 Waging Peace in Vietnam
 Winter Soldier Investigation

Footnotes

External links
 Donald Duncan Testimony and Questioning, Russell Commission, November 1967
 "Winter Soldier Investigation testimony," Vietnam Veterans Against the War, Jan 31 to February 2, 1971. 
 Donald Duncan oral history from A Matter of Conscience – GI Resistance During the Vietnam War
 Sir! No Sir!, a film about GI resistance to the Vietnam War
 Waging Peace in Vietnam – US Soldiers and Veterans Who Opposed the War
 A Matter of Conscience – GI Resistance During the Vietnam War
 Waging Peace in Vietnam Interviews with GI resisters

1930 births
2009 deaths
20th-century American male writers
20th-century American non-fiction writers
Activists from Toronto
American anti-war activists
Members of the United States Army Special Forces
New Left
People from Madison, Indiana
Recipients of the Legion of Merit
United States Army personnel of the Vietnam War
United States Army soldiers
Writers from Berkeley, California